Malik Zorgane (born 27 June 1965) is an Algerian football manager and a former player. He spent the majority of his playing career with ES Sétif.

Zorgane is a former international and had 9 caps for the Algeria national team. He was a member of the Algeria squad that won the 1991 Afro-Asian Cup of Nations.

International career
Zorgane made his debut for the Algeria national team on 13 November 1988 as a starter in a friendly against Mali. Zorgane scored the first goal in the game in the 15th minute with Algeria going on to win 7-0.

National team statistics

International goals
Scores and results list Algeria's goal tally first.

Honours

Club
 ES Sétif
Algerian Championnat National: 1986-87
African Cup of Champions Clubs: 1988
Afro-Asian Club Championship: 1989

Country
 Algeria
Afro-Asian Cup of Nations: 1991

References

External links
 

1965 births
Algeria international footballers
Algeria youth international footballers
Algerian expatriate footballers
Algerian expatriate sportspeople in Tunisia
Algerian footballers
Algerian football managers
ES Sétif players
Living people
US Monastir (football) players
Expatriate footballers in Tunisia
Association football midfielders
21st-century Algerian people